Das Beste aus meinem Leben is a German ARD family television series. It was broadcast between 15 December 2006 and 2 February 2007.

See also
List of German television series

External links
 

2006 German television series debuts
2007 German television series endings
German-language television shows
Das Erste original programming
Television series based on short fiction